The Montecristo cichlid (Oscura heterospila) is a species of freshwater fish from the Atlantic slope of southern Mexico and Guatemala. This cichlid occurs in lagoons, creeks and rivers with slight to moderate current in the Grijalva–Usumacinta, Candelaria, Champotón and Coatzacoalcos river drainages. It is currently recognized as the only species in its genus, but it is closely related to –and possibly should be merged into– Vieja (a genus where it also has been placed in the past).

References

Heroini
Fish described in 1936